Paratrachelas is a genus of araneomorph spiders in the family Trachelidae, first described by M. M. Kovblyuk & A. A. Nadolny in 2009.

Species
 it contains five species:
Paratrachelas acuminus (Zhu & An, 1988) — Russia (Far East), China, Korea
Paratrachelas atlantis Bosselaers & Bosmans, 2010 — Algeria
Paratrachelas ibericus (Bosselaers, Urones, Barrientos & Alberdi, 2009) — Portugal, Spain, France, Algeria
Paratrachelas maculatus (Thorell, 1875) — France to Ukraine, Turkey, Israel
Paratrachelas validus (Simon, 1884) — Portugal, Spain, Italy

References

External links

Araneomorphae genera
Trachelidae